Old Settler may refer to:

 The Old Settler, a mountain in the Lillooet Ranges of British Columbia, Canada
 Old Settlers, Cherokee tribal members who relocated west to the Arkansaw or Indian Territories prior to 1828
 Old Settler (sternwheeler), a sternwheel steamboat that ran on Puget sound from 1878 to about 1895
 Old Settlers' Association, a social organization in Omaha, Nebraska, United States
 Old Settler's Song (Acres of Clams), a song by Francis D. Henry around 1874